Uthramvilakku is a temple festival celebrated at Edakkunni in Ollur, south of Thrissur in central Kerala, south India. The highlight of the event is an over four-hour Panchari melam in the temple compound past midnight on the uthram day, with each of the five caparisoned elephants on the occasion carrying a deity each from as many temples.

Origin
The uthramvilakku has its origin in uthrampattu, a form of ritual singing (Brahmani pattu) that was later converted into Uthramvilakku in its present form about 150 years ago. This is celebrated on the uthram day of the Meenam month of the Malayalam calendar.

After the kodiyettam (flag-hoisting) a small pooram ceremony is performed on three elephants. Over the succeeding six days the deity of Lord Bhagavathy is taken around the historic Perumanam village astride an elephant, receiving the obeisances of devotees and taking part in pooram ceremonies in different temples along the route.

The ceremonial elephant also participates in the traditional Anayottam (elephant race) at Piddikaparambu; which is near Cherpu about 14 km south-west of the town of Thrissur. This is a unique elephant race as idols of different deities from different temples too take part in it.

The day's functions
The itinerary is as follows:-

 06:30: The  Bhagavathy returns from the town of Arattupuzha.
 09:30:Ceremonial reception of the deity.
 18:00:Lamp-lighting ceremony and nadaswara recitals.
 19:00: Panchavadyam with five elephants.
 22:00 : Bhagavathy deity is led in procession outside the sanctum sanctorum with the accompaniment of valia pani orchestra. The Bhagavathy idol is then hoisted atop a huge tusker which is joined by four others. This is followed by elaborate recitations, on various instruments including Keli, kombu pattu and Kuzhal Pattu.
 00:00: The illustrious Panchari melam is performed by Kerala's most renowned percussion experts. They are joined in this effort by as many as 100 artistes on the chenda, ilathalam, kombu and kuzhal. Besides the presiding deity of Edakkunni temple, four deities from nearby temples join the Bhagavathy. They are Thaikatusserry, Chakkamkulangara, Namkulam, and Chittachatakudam. The melam lasting nearly five hours culminates with a brief but vibrant display of fireworks.

Closing ceremony
This is followed by an Idakka pradakshinam, a ritualistic circumambulation which sees participation of people in the belief that the run would help them get rid of ailments. By sunrise, the Bhagavathy sets for the padikkal pooram. This is the only time in a year that deity goes out through the western door. After the Padikkal pooram, the ceremonial send off of the neighbouring deities (Upacharam) takes place. The festivities come to an end with the kodikutthu (uprooting of the festival mascot).

References
 Edakkunni Temple website

Culture of Thrissur
Festivals in Thrissur district